The following lists events that happened during 1979 in the Republic of Equatorial Guinea.

Incumbents
President: Francisco Macías Nguema (till 3 August)

President: Teodoro Obiang Nguema Mbasogo (from 3 August)

Events
3 August – Dictator Francisco Macías Nguema of Equatorial Guinea was overthrown in a bloody coup d'état led by his nephew, Teodoro Obiang
18 August – Ousted dictator Francisco Macías Nguema is captured near his home village of Mongomo.
23 August – The first ministerial cabinet of the Supreme Military Council was constituted, composed of eleven members:
29 September – Francisco Macías Nguema and six other defendants were convicted of genocide, embezzlement and treason, and were executed by a firing squad of soldiers from Morocco.
31 October – For the first time since 1971, a cooperation agreement and a protocol of action was signed between Spain and Equatorial Guinea, followed on 5 December by a financial cooperation agreement, and two protocols.

Births
 20 November – Miguel Mba,  Equatoguinean football goalkeeper

See also
Francisco Pascual Obama Asue
2004 Equatorial Guinea coup d'état attempt

References

1979 in Equatorial Guinea
1970s in Equatorial Guinea
Years of the 20th century in Equatorial Guinea
Equatorial Guinea
Equatorial Guinea